Frank D. "Red" Smith was a college football player.

Early years
He attended preparatory school at Mooney School in Franklin, Tennessee along with Ed Hamilton and Frank Kyle.

Cumberland
Smith was a prominent center for the Cumberland Bulldogs of Cumberland University in Lebanon, Tennessee, inducted into the Cumberland Sports Hall of Fame in 1978.

1903
At Cumberland he was a member of Pi Kappa Alpha, praised for his athleticism along with M. O. Bridges. Smith, M. O. Bridges, and M. L. Bridges helped lead Cumberland to a share of the 1903 Southern Intercollegiate Athletic Association (SIAA) title. Smith was selected All-Southern.  Cumberland coach A. L. Phillips said Smith was the "only man he ever saw who has reduced football to a science." That year, Cumberland defeated Vanderbilt and tied coach John Heisman's Clemson Tigers football team at the end of the year in the game billed as the "SIAA championship game" in Montgomery, Alabama on Thanksgiving Day. Cumberland rushed out to an early 11 to 0 lead. Wiley Lee Umphlett in Creating the Big Game: John W. Heisman and the Invention of American Football writes, "During the first half, Clemson was never really in the game due mainly to formidable line play of the Bridges brothers–giants in their day at 6 feet 4 inches–and a big center named "Red" Smith, was all over the field backing up the Cumberland line on defense. Clemson had been outweighed before, but certainly not like this."

1904
He was captain of its 1904 team.

1905
Smith was again selected All-Southern in 1905.

References

American football centers
Cumberland Phoenix football players
All-Southern college football players
American football linebackers